Corrado Fortuna (born 31 March 1978) is an Italian actor and director.

Career

Born in Palermo, Fortuna debuted in 2002 with the title role in the film My Name Is Tanino, directed by Paolo Virzi, with whom he then worked as assistant director on the film Caterina in the Big City in 2003. In the same year, he played the title role in an autobiographical drama film that marked the directorial debut by singer-songwriter Franco Battiato, Lost Love. Thanks to his performance in My Name Is Tanino and Lost Love, in 2004 Fortuna won the "Guglielmo Biraghi" prize awarded by Italian Film Journalists Union. In the same year, he had a role in the  film  Alla luce del sole (the biography of Father Pino Puglisi, a priest murdered by the Mafia), directed by Roberto Faenza with Luca Zingaretti.
In 2009 Fortuna returned to the cinema to star in Baaria,  directed by Giuseppe Tornatore.  In 2012 he had a small role in the film To Rome with Love directed by Woody Allen. In 2014, he was among the lead actors in Scusate se esisto!, with Paola Cortellesi and Raul Bova.
Over the years, he developed simultaneously his acting career and his work as a director of documentaries and video clips.
In 2014 he published his first novel, Un giorno sarai un posto bellissimo, published by Baldini & Castoldi.

Cinema 

 My Name Is Tanino, director Paolo Virzì (2002)
 Perduto amor, director Franco Battiato (2003)
 Caterina va in città (assistant director ), director Paolo Virzì (2003)
 Alla luce del sole, director Roberto Faenza (2004)
 Agente matrimoniale, director Christian Bisceglia (2006)
 Aspettando il sole, director Ago Panini (2008)
 Il mattino ha l'oro in bocca, director Francesco Patierno (2008)
 Chi nasce tondo..., director Alessandro Valori (2008)
 Una notte blu cobalto, director Daniele Gangemi (2008)
 Feisbum! Il film - Episodio: Maledetto tag, director Dino Giarrusso (2009) 
 Viola di mare, director Donatella Maiorca (2009)
 Baarìa, director Giuseppe Tornatore (2009)
 I più grandi di tutti, director Carlo Virzì (2011)
 Si può fare l'amore vestiti?, director Dario Acocella (2012)
 To Rome with Love, director Woody Allen (2012)
 Amiche da morire, director Giorgia Farina (2013)
 Il capitale umano, (assistant director) director Paolo Virzì (2013)
 Un fidanzato per mia moglie, director Davide Marengo (2014)
 Scusate se esisto!, director Riccardo Milani (2014)
 La leggenda di Bob Wind, director Dario Baldi (2016)
 Attesa e cambiamenti, director Sergio Colabona (2016)

Television 
 Cefalonia, director Riccardo Milani -  Rai Uno (2005)
 Il commissario De Luca, director Antonio Frazzi -  Rai Uno (2007)
 Tutti pazzi per amore, director Riccardo Milani e Laura Muscardin - Rai Uno (2008-2009)
 Tutti pazzi per amore 2, director Riccardo Milani e Laura Muscardin - Rai Uno (2010)
 Le cose che restano, director Gianluca Maria Tavarelli (2010)
 Mia madre, director Ricky Tognazzi - Rai Uno (2010)
 La nuova squadra - Spaccanapoli - Rai Tre (2011)
 Tutti pazzi per amore 3, director Laura Muscardin Rai Uno (2011) (episodes 1 and 26)
  Conosco un posticino, (author) - Dove TV
 Di padre in figlia director Riccardo Milani - Rai Uno (2017)
 Questo nostro amore 80, director Luca Ribuoli - Rai Uno (2018)
 Anna - Sky Italia (2021)

Director 
 Let Me Be - Videoclip of the  Waines (2009) 
 Wooooo - Videoclip of the  Waines (2010)
 D'estate - Videoclip of  Alessandro D'Orazi (2010)
 Delicatamente - Videoclip dei MinikBros (2009) - 
 Isola Femmina - documentary (2005) - with Gaspare Pellegrino
 Se penso a Casa - documentary (2010) - with  Gaspare Pellegrino
 La linea della palma - documentary (2012) - with  Gaspare Pellegrino

Writer 
 Un giorno sarai un posto bellissimo - novel - (2014) - published by  Baldini & Castoldi

Awards 
 Premio Guglielmo Biraghi for My Name Is Tanino and for Lost Love (2004)
 Premio as best director to the  Premio Italiano Videoclip Indipendente (Meeting degli Indipendenti di Faenza)  videoclip Let me be (2009)

Notes
This article originated as a translation of this version of its counterpart in the Italian-language Wikipedia.

External links 

Film people from Palermo
1978 births
Living people
Italian male film actors
Italian male television actors
Italian documentary filmmakers
Male actors from Palermo